Gorenja Vas is a settlement on the right bank of the Soča River opposite Kanal in the Littoral region of Slovenia.

References

External links
Gorenja Vas on Geopedia

Populated places in the Municipality of Kanal